East Keilor Football Club is an Australian rules football club located 16 km northwest of Melbourne in the suburb of East Keilor. The club was founded in 1967 as a junior club.

The Senior club was established in 1971 in B Grade and the club's first premiership was in 1978. The club's second B Grade premiership was in 1992. The club won Senior Division 2 premierships in 2012, 2014 and 2016.

After losing the A Grade grand final in 1993 the club's won its only A Grade premiership in 1994.

The club fields eight under-age teams. The club has won 28 junior premierships.

Senior Premierships  (6) 
Division 2
2012, 2014, 2016.
B Grade
1978, 1992
A Grade
1994

Notable AFL footballers 
 Mark Harvey – Essendon
 Gary Young – Essendon
 Rohan Welsh – Carlton
 David Calthorpe – Essendon and Brisbane Lions
 Matthew Hogg – Footscray and Carlton
 Glenn Manton – Essendon and Carlton
 Troy Moloney – Footscray
 Mark Athorn - Footscray, Fitzroy, Sydney and Carlton
Ash Fernee - Adelaide

References

External links 
 EDFL Website
 Official club website

Books 
 History of football in Melbourne's north west – John Stoward -  

Essendon District Football League clubs
1967 establishments in Australia
Australian rules football clubs established in 1967
Sport in the City of Moonee Valley
Australian rules football clubs in Melbourne